Brad Arthur (born 21 May 1974) is a professional rugby league coach who is the head coach of the Parramatta Eels in the National Rugby League (NRL).

He was the caretaker coach at the Eels for the final six games of the 2012 NRL season.

Background
Arthur was born in Sydney, New South Wales, Australia.

His son Jakob Arthur plays for the Eels in the National Rugby League.

Playing career
Arthur was a Parramatta Eels junior and played SG Ball and Under-21s for the club. He then moved to the Penrith Panthers where Royce Simmons advised him he would never make first grade.

Coaching career
In 1997 Arthur, aged only 22, accepted a job as a captain-coach of the Batemans Bay Tigers. In his first season the club didn't win a match; however, the club made the finals in their second year.
Arthur then was the captain-coach of the Cairns Brothers club for eight seasons, leading the club to four premierships and six grand finals.
In 2007 he was appointed the Melbourne Storm's NRL Development Coach. The side won the competition that year. In 2008 he was appointed the Melbourne Storm's inaugural Toyota Cup (Under-20s) coach. The side won the 2009 Grand Final. In 2010 he was promoted to an assistant coach in Melbourne alongside Stephen Kearney.

In 2011, he was appointed the assistant coach of the Parramatta Eels, following the appointment of Kearney as head coach. Kearney was fired in 2012 with six games remaining and Arthur was appointed the caretaker coach. Following the appointment of Ricky Stuart as head coach for 2013, Arthur was informed that he would not be retained as an assistant coach.

Starting in 2013, Arthur was appointed as the assistant coach to Geoff Toovey at the Manly Warringah Sea Eagles. As of 16 October 2013, Arthur accepted a three-year deal to join the Parramatta Eels as head coach.  After being announced as the new head coach Arthur told the media that there would be "No more wooden spoons" under his tenure.  In response to one of the reporters Arthur said "Yeah, well we won’t be getting three ... we definitely won't be getting three wooden spoons".

In his first season as head coach, Arthur led Parramatta to 10th place on the ladder in The 2014 NRL Season.  With two games to go in the regular season, Parramatta needed to win one game out of the remaining two fixtures to qualify but lost to Newcastle and Canberra (who were both lower on the ladder) respectively.  Parramatta missed the top 8 by two competition points. In 2015, Parramatta missed out on the finals by finishing 12th.

In 2016, Arthur was at the forefront of the salary cap scandal which rocked the club but was praised by the media and the players for his leadership skills and managing to keep the team together.  Parramatta finished the season in 14th position but would have had enough points to qualify for the finals if not for the 12 point deduction handed to the club for breaching the salary cap.

In the 2017 season, Arthur guided Parramatta to their first finals series since 2009 with the club finishing fourth on the premiership ladder. Even though Parramatta then went on to lose both their finals matches, Arthur was praised for his performances as coach.
In 2018, Arthur led Parramatta to club's 14th wooden spoon claiming only 6 wins all season. Arthur claimed responsibility for the season and the board admitted he would see out his contract which was due to end in 2019.

At the start of the 2019 NRL season, Arthur guided Parramatta to consecutive victories over Penrith and rivals Canterbury-Bankstown in the opening rounds of the competition.  In Round 6, Parramatta defeated Wests Tigers 51–6 in the opening NRL game at the new Western Sydney Stadium.  It was then revealed by the club that talks had begun in relation to Arthur's future at the club.  In Round 9 of the competition, Parramatta were defeated 64-10 by Melbourne at Suncorp Stadium.  The following week on 14 May 2019, Arthur was given a two-year contract extension keeping him as head coach of the club until the end of the 2021 season.

Between round 12 and round 22 of the 2019 NRL season, Arthur guided Parramatta to win 8 of their next 10 matches.  Parramatta confirmed their spot in the 2019 finals series with a 36–12 win over the last placed Gold Coast side.  In round 25 against Manly-Warringah, Parramatta won the match 32-16 which saw the club leapfrog Manly into 5th to finish the 2019 regular season.

In week one of the 2019 finals series, Arthur guided Parramatta to a 58–0 victory over Brisbane at the new Western Sydney Stadium in the elimination final.  The victory was the biggest win by a team in finals history eclipsing Newtown's 55–7 victory over St George in 1944.
The following week in the elimination final against Melbourne, Parramatta were defeated 32–0 at AAMI Park which ended their season.

At the start of the 2020 NRL season, Arthur guided Parramatta to four consecutive victories which put the club on top of the table.  It was Parramatta's best start to a season since 1989.
The following week, Arthur guided Parramatta to victory over Penrith. The result meant it was Parramatta's best start to a season since 1986.
At the end of the 2020 regular season, Arthur guided Parramatta to a third-placed finish on the table.  It was the club's highest place on the table since the Parramatta Minor Premiership team of 2005.
In the 2020 finals series, Parramatta would once again be eliminated in consecutive weeks.  They lost to Melbourne in week one of the finals 36-24 after being up 12-0 early on in the game.  The following week they lost to South Sydney in the elimination final 38-24 after being up 18–8 at half-time.  Arthur also set an unwanted coaching record, becoming the first head coach in 112 seasons of the game to coach a side for seven consecutive years and fail to make at least one preliminary final.

In the 2021 NRL season, Arthur guided Parramatta to a sixth placed finish on the table.  The club made the second week of the finals but were once again eliminated from the competition at that stage losing 8-6 against Penrith. On 8 October 2021, Arthur re-signed with Parramatta until the end of 2024.
In the 2022 NRL season, Arthur guided Parramatta to fourth place on the table which meant they qualified for the finals.  Parramatta would lose in the opening week of the finals against Penrith before defeating Canberra the following week to book the club a place in the preliminary finals for the first time since 2009.  Parramatta would go on to upset North Queensland in Townsville to reach the 2022 NRL Grand Final.  After going into half time at 18-0 down, Parramatta would lose the final 28-12.
On 15 March 2023, Arthur signed a two-year contract extension to remain as Parramatta head coach until the end of the 2025 NRL season.

Statistics

†-Parramatta were deducted 12 competition points and their for/against tally accumulated between rounds 1-9 of the 2016 season for gross long-term salary cap breaches

-Arthur was named interim head coach for final 6 games of the 2012 NRL season, after Stephen Kearney was sacked.

References

External links
Parramatta Eels profile
Eels profile

1974 births
Living people
Australian rugby league coaches
Parramatta Eels coaches
Rugby league second-rows